Dr. Allen Krebs (born c.1934) was a Marxian economics professor who founded the Free University of New York (FUNY).

Krebs was involved in the May 2nd Movement, a youth affiliate of the Progressive Labor Party. He set up FUNY after being sacked from Adelphi University.

References

External links 
Vaughan, Roger (1966) "The anti-university is the newest meeting place for young radicals". In LIFE, 20th May 1966, p.119. 

Marxian economists
Year of birth uncertain
Possibly living people